The practice of charity is the voluntary giving of help to those in need, as a humanitarian act, unmotivated by self-interest. There are a number of philosophies about charity, often associated with religion.

Etymology 
The word charity originated in late Old English to mean a "Christian love of one's fellows", and up until at least the beginning of the 20th century, this meaning remained synonymous with charity. Aside from this original meaning, charity is etymologically linked to Christianity, with the word originally entering into the English language through the Old French word charité, which was derived from the Latin caritas, a word commonly used in the Vulgate New Testament to translate the Greek word agape, a distinct form of love (see the article: Charity (virtue)).

Over time, the meaning of charity has evolved from one of "Christian love" to that of "providing for those in need; generosity and giving" (cf. offertory), a transition which began with the Old French word charité. Thus, while the older Douay-Rheims and King James versions of the Bible translate instances of agape (such as those that appear in 1 Corinthians 13) as "charity", modern English versions of the Bible typically translate agape as  "love".

Practice 

Charitable giving is the act of giving money, goods or time to the unfortunate, either directly or by means of a charitable trust or other worthy cause.  Charitable giving as a religious act or duty is referred to as almsgiving or alms. The name stems from the most obvious expression of the virtue of charity; giving the recipients of it the means they need to survive. The impoverished, particularly those widowed or orphaned, and the ailing or injured, are generally regarded as the proper recipients of charity. The people who cannot support themselves and lack outside means of support sometimes become "beggars", directly soliciting aid from strangers encountered in public.

Some groups regard charity as being distributed towards other members from within their particular group. Although giving to those nearly connected to oneself is sometimes called charity—as in the saying "Charity begins at home"—normally charity denotes giving to those not related, with filial piety and like terms for supporting one's family and friends.  Indeed, treating those related to the giver as if they were strangers in need of charity has led to the figure of speech "as cold as charity"—providing for one's relatives as if they were strangers, without affection.

Most forms of charity are concerned with providing basic necessities such as food, water, clothing, healthcare and shelter, but other actions may be performed as charity:  visiting the imprisoned or the homebound, ransoming captives, educating orphans, even social movements. Donations to causes that benefit the unfortunate indirectly, such as donations to fund cancer research, are also charity.

With regards to religious aspects, the recipient of charity may offer to pray for the benefactor. In medieval Europe, it was customary to feast the poor at the funeral in return for their prayers for the deceased.  Institutions may commemorate benefactors by displaying their names, up to naming buildings or even the institution itself after the benefactors.  If the recipient makes material return of more than a token value, the transaction is normally not called charity.

In the past century, many charitable organizations have created a "charitable model" in which donators give to conglomerates give to recipients. Examples of this include the Make a Wish Foundation (John Cena holds the title for most wishes granted by a single individual, with over 450 wishes) and the World Wildlife Fund. Today some charities have modernized, and allow people to donate online, through websites such as JustGiving. Originally charity entailed the benefactor directly giving the goods to the receiver.  This practice was continued by some individuals, for example, "CNN Hero" Sal Dimiceli, and service organizations, such as the Jaycees. With the rise of more social peer-to-peer processes, many charities are moving away from the charitable model and starting to adopt this more direct donator to recipient approach. Examples of this include Global Giving (direct funding of community development projects in developing countries), DonorsChoose (for US-based projects), Kiva (funding loans administered by microfinance organizations in developing countries) and Zidisha (funding individual microfinance borrowers directly).

Institutions evolved to carry out the labor of assisting the poor, and these institutions, called charities, provide the bulk of charitable giving today, in terms of monetary value.  These include orphanages, food banks, religious institutes dedicated to care of the poor, hospitals, organizations that visit the homebound and imprisoned, and many others.  Such institutions allow those whose time or inclination does not lend themselves to directly care for the poor to enable others to do so, both by providing money for the work and supporting them while they do the work.  Institutions can also attempt to more effectively sort out the actually needy from those who fraudulently claim charity.  Early Christians particularly recommended the care of the unfortunate to the charge of the local bishop.

There have been examinations of who gives more to charity.  One study conducted in the United States found that as a percentage of income, charitable giving increased as income decreased.  The poorest fifth of Americans, for example, gave away 4.3% of their income, while the wealthiest fifth gave away 2.1%.  In absolute terms, this was an average of $453 on an average income of $10,531, compared to $3,326 on an income of $158,388.

Studies have also found that "individuals who are religious are more likely to give money to charitable organizations" and they are also more likely to give more money than those who are not religious. Among those individuals are members of American religious communities, about whom the Institute for Social Policy and Understanding conducted a recent study regarding philanthropic and charitable giving. The study found that American Muslim donation patterns when it comes to charitable giving align mostly with other American faith groups, like Christian (Protestant and Catholic), and Jewish communities, but that American Muslims were more likely to donate out of a sense of religious obligation and a belief that those who have ought to give to those who do not. The study also found that most American faith groups prioritize charity towards their own houses of worship when it comes to monetary donations, and then other causes. Muslims and Jews contributed more than other religious groups to civil rights protection organizations, while Christians were the most likely to make charitable contributions to youth and family services with Evangelicals giving the most, followed by Mainline Protestants and then Roman Catholics.

A study from 2021 found that when prospective donors were asked to choose between two similar donation targets, they were more likely to opt out of donating altogether.

Criticism 

A philosophical critique of charity can be found in Oscar Wilde's essay The Soul of Man Under Socialism, where he calls it "a ridiculously inadequate mode of partial restitution . . . usually accompanied by some impertinent attempt on the part of the sentimentalist to tyrannise over [the poor's] private lives", as well as a remedy that prolongs the "disease" of poverty, rather than curing it.
Wilde's thoughts are cited with approval by Slavoj Žižek, and the Slovenian thinker adds his description of the effect of charity on the charitable:

Friedrich Engels, in his 1845 treatise on the condition of the working class in England, points out that charitable giving, whether by governments or individuals, is often seen by the givers as a means to conceal suffering that is unpleasant to see. Engels quotes from a letter to the editor of an English newspaper who complains that

streets are haunted by swarms of beggars, who try to awaken the pity of the passers-by in a most shameless and annoying manner, by exposing their tattered clothing, sickly aspect, and disgusting wounds and deformities. I should think that when one not only pays the poor-rate, but also contributes largely to the charitable institutions, one had done enough to earn a right to be spared such disagreeable and impertinent molestations.

The English bourgeoisie, Engels concludes,

is charitable out of self-interest; it gives nothing outright, but regards its gifts as a business matter, makes a bargain with the poor, saying: "If I spend this much upon benevolent institutions, I thereby purchase the right not to be troubled any further, and you are bound thereby to stay in your dusky holes and not to irritate my tender nerves by exposing your misery. You shall despair as before, but you shall despair unseen, this I require, this I purchase with my subscription of twenty pounds for the infirmary!" It is infamous, this charity of a Christian bourgeois!

The American theologian, Reinhold Niebuhr also opined that charity could more than often act as a substitute for real justice. In his 1932 work Moral Man and Immoral Society he criticized charities funding Black education, writing that the "white philanthropy" failed to make a "frontal attack upon the social injustices" from which the Black Americans suffered. He wrote: "We have previously suggested that philanthropy combines genuine pity with the display of power and that the latter element explains why the powerful are more inclined to be generous than to grant social justice."

The philosopher Peter Singer opposes charity on the grounds that the interests of all people should count equally since their geographic location or citizenship status does not affect their obligations towards society.

The Institute of Economic Affairs published a report in 2012 called "Sock Puppets: How the government lobbies itself and why", which criticized the phenomenon of governments funding charities which then lobby the government for changes which the government wanted all along.

Needs-based versus rights-based debate 
Increasing awareness of poverty and food insecurity has led to debates among scholars about the needs-based versus the rights-based approach. The needs-based approach solely provides recipients what they need, not expecting any action in response. Examples of needs-based approaches include charitable giving, philanthropy, and other private investments. A rights-based approach, on the other hand, includes participation from both ends, with the recipients being active influences on policies. Politically, a rights-based approach would be illustrated in policies of income redistribution, wage floors, and cash subsidies. Mariana Chilton, in the American Journal of Public Health, suggested that current government policies reflect the needs-based approach. Chilton argued this leads to a misconception that charity is the cure for basic needs insecurity, and this misconception drives the government to avoid welfare reform and instead to rely on charitable organizations and philanthropists. Amelia Barwise supported Chilton's argument by describing the consequences of philanthropy. Using an example of Michael Bloomberg's donation of $1.8 billion to Johns Hopkins University for student debts, Barwise questioned the most effective use for this money. She listed one motivation of philanthropy as to avoid paying federal taxes, so the donor may be recognized for their generosity and send their earned money to organizations they are passionate about. Barwise therefore implied that Bloomberg's actions resemble this motivation, since he has saved $600 million in federal taxes and donated the money to his alma mater. Furthermore, this non-politicized idea of philanthropy and charitable giving is linked to the government's approach to poverty. Barwise said that Americans have an innate distrust of the government, causing them to favor private and de-politicized actions such as charity. Her research explores consequences of philanthropic actions and how the money can be used more effectively. First, Barwise stated that since philanthropy allows for tax evasion, which decreases opportunities for welfare policies that would support all low-income workers. Furthermore, philanthropy can diminish the institution's mission and give more power and influence to the donor.

Acknowledging these consequences of philanthropy and the diminishing of public funding, Mariana Chilton offered solutions through the rights-based approach. Chilton argued that the government should adopt a more rights-based approach to include more people in their policies and significantly improve basic needs insecurity. She called for government accountability, an increase of transparency, an increase of public participation, and the acknowledgement of vulnerability and discrimination caused by current policies. She argued for increased federal legislation that provides social safety nets through entitlement programs, recognizing SNAP as a small example. Chilton concluded with a list of four strategies for a national plan: 1) increase monitoring to assess threats to food insecurity, 2) improve national, state, and local coordination, 3) improve accountability, and 4) utilize public participation to help construct policies.

Philosophies

Charity in Christianity 

In medieval Europe during the 12th and 13th centuries, Latin Christendom underwent a charitable revolution.  Rich patrons founded many leprosaria and hospitals for the sick and poor. New confraternities and religious orders emerged with the primary mission of engaging in intensive charitable work. Historians debate the causes. Some argue that this movement was spurred by economic and material forces, as well as a burgeoning urban culture. Other scholars argue that developments in spirituality and devotional culture were central. For still other scholars, medieval charity was primarily a way to elevate one's social status and affirm existing hierarchies of power.

Tzedakah in Judaism

In religious Judaism, tzedakah—a Hebrew term literally meaning righteousness but commonly used to signify charity—refers to the religious obligation to do what is right and just. Because it is commanded by the Torah and not voluntary, the practice is not technically an act of charity; such a concept is virtually nonexistent in Jewish tradition. Jews give tzedakah, which can take the form of money, time and resources to the needy, out of "righteousness" and "justice" rather than benevolence, generosity, or charitableness. The Torah requires that 10 percent of a Jew's income be allotted to righteous deeds or causes, regardless if the receiving party is rich or poor. However, if one regards Judaism in its wider modern meaning, acts of charity can go far beyond the religious prescriptions of tzedakah and also beyond the wider concept of ethical obligation. See also mitzvot and halukkah.

Zakat and Sadaqah in Islam 
In Islam there are two methods of charity. One called Zakat, the other is called Sadaqa.

Zakat is one of the five pillars upon which the Muslim religion is based, where 2.5% of one's saving is compulsory to be given as Zakat per Islamic calendar year, provided that the saving is beyond the threshold limit, called Nisab, usually determined by the religious authority.

Sadaqa is voluntary charity or contribution. Sadaqah can be given using money, personal items, time or other resources. There is no minimum or maximum requirement for Sadaqa. Even smiling to other people is considered a Sadaqah.

Dāna in Indian religions 
The practice of charity is called Dāna or Daana in Hinduism, Buddhism and Jainism. It is the virtue of generosity or giving. Dāna has been defined in traditional texts, state Krishnan and Manoj, as "any action of relinquishing the ownership of what one considered or identified as one's own, and investing the same in a recipient without expecting anything in return". Karna, Mahabali and Harishchandra are heroes also known for giving charity.

The earliest known discussion of charity as a virtuous practice, in Indian texts, is in Rigveda. According to other ancient texts of Hinduism, dāna can take the form of feeding or giving to an individual in distress or need. It can also take the form of philanthropic public projects that empower and help many.

Dāna leads to one of the perfections (pāramitā). This can be characterized by unattached and unconditional generosity, giving and letting go.

Historical records, such as those by the Persian historian Abū Rayḥān al-Bīrūnī who visited India in early 11th century, suggest dāna has been an ancient and medieval era practice among Indian religions.

Effective altruism

Effective altruism is a philosophy and social movement that uses evidence and reasoning to determine the most effective ways to benefit others. Effective altruism encourages individuals to consider all causes and actions and to act in the way that brings about the greatest positive impact, based upon their values. It is the broad, evidence-based and cause-neutral approach that distinguishes effective altruism from traditional altruism or charity. Effective altruism is part of the larger movement towards evidence-based practices.

While a substantial proportion of effective altruists have focused on the nonprofit sector, the philosophy of effective altruism applies more broadly to prioritizing the scientific projects, companies, and policy initiatives which can be estimated to save lives, help people, or otherwise have the biggest benefit. People associated with the movement include philosopher Peter Singer, Facebook co founder Dustin Moskovitz, Cari Tuna, Oxford-based researchers William MacAskill and Toby Ord, professional poker player Liv Boeree, and writer Jacy Reese Anthis.

See also

 Alms
 Altruism
 Baksheesh
 Charitable organization
 Charity badge
 Charitable trust
 Charity fraud
 Dāna
 Effective altruism
 Evangelical counsels
 Foundation (charity)
 Fundraising
 Generosity
 Indulgence
 International Day of Charity
 P2P Charity
 Philanthropy
 Pro bono
 Selfless service
 Tzedakah
 Zakat
 International Red Cross and Red Crescent Movement
 Social policy

References

Further reading 
 Beer, Jeremy. The Philanthropic Revolution: An Alternative History of American Charity (U of Pennsylvania Press, 2015)
 Borsay, Anne, and Peter Shapely, eds. Medicine, Charity and Mutual Aid: The Consumption of Health and Welfare in Britain, c. 1550–1950 (Ashgate, 2013.)
 Cunningham, Hugh. "Philanthropy and its critics: a history." in Behrooz Morvaridi ed., New Philanthropy and Social Justice: Debating the Conceptual and Policy Discourse (2015): 17+
 Davis, Adam J. "The Social and Religious Meanings of Charity in Medieval Europe"History Compass (2014) 12#12 PP 935–950.
 Daunton, Martin J. ed.  Charity, Self-Interest and Welfare in the English Past (1996)
 Jones, Colin. "Some recent trends in the history of charity." in Martin J. Daunton, ed.,  Charity, Self-Interest and Welfare in the English Past (1996) pp: 51–63.
 Jordan, W. K. The Charities of London, 1480–1660: The Aspirations and the Achievements of the Urban Society (1960).
 Morris, Andrew.Comme Tu ta appellant Je ma appel legend "How the State and Labor Saved Charitable Fundraising: Community Chests, Payroll Deduction, and the Public–Private Welfare State, 1920–1950." Studies in American Political Development 29.01 (2015): 106–125.
 Roddy, Sarah, Julie–Marie Strange, and Bertrand Taithe. "The Charity-Mongers of Modern Babylon: Bureaucracy, Scandal, and the Transformation of the Philanthropic Marketplace, c. 1870–1912." Journal of British Studies 54#1 (2015): 118–137.
 Sabra, A. Poverty and Charity in Medieval Islam: Mamluk Egypt, 1250–1517 (2000).
 Scott, Anne M., ed. Experiences of Charity, 1250–1650 (Ashgate, 2015)
 Teeuwen, Daniëlle. "Collections for the poor: monetary charitable donations in Dutch towns, c. 1600–1800." Continuity and Change 27#2 (2012): 271–299. online
 Van Leeuwen, Marco H.D. "Logic of charity: poor relief in preindustrial Europe." Journal of interdisciplinary history (1994): 589–613. online

External links 

!
Virtue
Ethical principles